Aenictus chapmani is a species of dark brown army ant found in Papua New Guinea, Philippines, Malaysia, and Indonesia. Specific populations have been studied in the Huon Peninsula and near Dumaguete.

References

Dorylinae
Hymenoptera of Asia
Insects described in 1964